Nevenka Pogačnik (born 14 April 1936) is a Slovenian gymnast. She competed in five events at the 1960 Summer Olympics.

References

1936 births
Living people
Slovenian female artistic gymnasts
Olympic gymnasts of Yugoslavia
Gymnasts at the 1960 Summer Olympics
Sportspeople from Ljubljana